Broughton Island is the second largest island of The Snares, at .

The island is named after William Robert Broughton.

See also 

 New Zealand Subantarctic Islands
 List of Antarctic and subantarctic islands#List of subantarctic islands
 List of islands of New Zealand
 List of islands
 Desert island

References

Islands of the Snares Islands / Tini Heke
Important Bird Areas of the Snares Islands